The Motor Row District is a historic district in Chicago's Near South Side community area. Motor Row includes buildings on Michigan Avenue between 2200 and 2500 south, directly west of McCormick Place convention center, and 1444, 1454, 1737, 1925, 2000 S. Michigan Ave., as well as 2246-3453 S. Indiana Ave., and 2211-47 S. Wabash Ave. The district was built between 1905 and 1936 by a number of notable architects.

Auto rows developed in numerous US cities shortly after 1900 as car companies sought to create districts where the sale and repair of cars could become an easy urban shopping experience. At its peak, as many as 116 different makes of automobiles were sold and repaired on Motor Row. Current-day marques that formerly had showrooms on Motor Row included Ford, Buick, Fiat, and Cadillac. Other marques with showrooms there that have since dissolved include Hudson, Locomobile, Marmon, and Pierce-Arrow. Currently, only one car dealer (Fiat/Alfa Romeo) still stands in Motor Row while the remaining buildings have been or are being redeveloped into condominiums, nightclubs, and retail storefronts.

Architecture 
The range of buildings in Motor Row illustrates the evolution of the automobile showroom and related product and service buildings, from simple two-story structures used for display and offices to multi-story buildings housing a variety of departments for the repair, storage, painting, and finishing of automobiles. Many of the buildings were designed by significant architects, including Holabird & Roche, Alfred Alschuler, Philip Maher, Albert Kahn, and Christian Eckstorm. The overall design highlights elaborately carved stone work, ornate facades and intricately scrolled ironwork that decorates recessed automotive doorways.

Though characterized by its auto showrooms, Motor Row was also home to newspaper The Chicago Defender, a newspaper voice for Chicago's large African American community. Chess Records was also located in Motor Row and acts such as Muddy Waters, The Rolling Stones, Willie Dixon and many other blues artists recorded there.

Motor Row was designated a Chicago Landmark on December 13, 2000.  It was added to the National Register of Historic Places on November 18, 2002.

Redevelopment 
In recent years, Motor Row has been undergoing a transformation into a music and entertainment district.  Motor Row Brewing (formerly known as Broad Shoulders Brewery) opened in the district in January 2015.  Riff Music Lounge opened in the district in 2013. Motor Row Brewing closed in 2021 as a result of the COVID-19 pandemic, and shortly thereafter a new brewing company, Duneyrr, was started in the same space by two former Lagunitas employees.

In 2011–2012, local officials attempted to lure a Cheap Trick-themed restaurant, music venue and museum to the district; however, this deal fell through in 2013.

Gallery

References

Further reading

 Motor Row Memories Jerome M. O'Connor, Chicago Tribune, October 21, 2012.

20th-century architecture in the United States
Historic districts in Chicago
Chicago Landmarks
Commercial buildings on the National Register of Historic Places in Chicago
Auto rows
Historic districts on the National Register of Historic Places in Illinois
Motor vehicle buildings and structures on the National Register of Historic Places
Transportation buildings and structures on the National Register of Historic Places in Illinois